Sir Thomas Pope Blount, 1st Baronet (12 September 164927 January 1697) was an English politician and baronet.

Life
Thomas Pope Blount was born on 12 September 1649 in Upper Holloway, Islington, London, son of Sir Henry Blount and Hester Wane. Thomas was the brother of Charles Blount. Thomas married on 22 July 1669 Jane Caesar, the daughter of Sir Henry Caesar.

He was admitted to Lincoln's Inn on 1 December 1668. In December 1678 he succeeded to the estate of Tittenhanger in Hertfordshire from his mother. He was the member of parliament for St Albans between 1679 and 1681 and for Hertfordshire between 1689 and 1697. He was a Commissioner of Public Accounts between 1694 and 1697.

Blount was created baronet of Tittenhanger on 27 January 1679. On his death in Tittenhanger the title passed to his son, Sir Thomas Pope Blount, 2nd Baronet.

Works
Censura celebrorum authorum sive tractatus in quo varia virorum doctorum de clarissimis cujusque seculi scriptoribus judicia traduntur (1690) 
Essays on Several Occasions (1692)
A Natural History, containing many not common observations extracted out of the best modern writers (1693)
De re poetica, or remarks upon Poetry, with Characters and Censures of the most considerable Poets (1694)

Blount's Essays on Several Subjects (or Several Occasions), originally published in 1692, touch on learning ancient and modern, and the education of children. In 1697 he added an essay that has been described as openly deistic. His  (1690) was originally compiled for Blount's own use, and is a dictionary in chronological order of what various eminent writers have said about one another. This involved enormous labour in Blount's time. It was published at Geneva in 1694 with all the quotations from modern languages translated into Latin, and again in 1710.

References

1649 births
1697 deaths
People from Islington (district)
Members of Lincoln's Inn
Baronets in the Baronetage of England
Members of the Green Ribbon Club
English MPs 1679
English MPs 1680–1681
English MPs 1681
English MPs 1689–1690
English MPs 1690–1695
English MPs 1695–1698
Civil servants in the Audit Office (United Kingdom)
Members of the Parliament of England for Hertfordshire